East Lake High School is a public high school serving students from grades 9–12 located in Tarpon Springs, Florida, and is part of the Pinellas County Schools. It has a 99% graduation rate which ranks it among the most graduating schools in the state of Florida.

The nine-building complex was inaugurated in 1987 and is located on 13 acres (53,000 m2) of land in northern Pinellas County. In 2014, the East Lake Middle School Academy of Engineering was constructed on the campus in addition to the high school.

Academics

The school is composed of four academies, the Biomedical Sciences Academy, Performing Arts Academy, Academy for Business Careers and the Eagle Works Engineering Academy.

The school's curriculum includes courses in English, Mathematics, Science, Social Studies, PDHPE (physical education), Health Education, and Fine Arts/Practical Arts. Elective courses include foreign languages (French, Spanish, German, and Chinese), Drama, Chorus, Art, Physical Education, Television Production, and Band classes. Other elective courses include Project Lead the Way's Biomedical Sciences and Business Careers.

Honors and Advanced Placement classes are offered, as well as the opportunity for dual enrollment at nearby St. Petersburg College. The school also offers vocational programs and Gold Seal Endorsements for students working towards a Bright Futures professional scholarship. The school's AP program saw East Lake students take nearly 1600 AP exams in the spring of 2013, more than any other high school in Pinellas County.

Academy of Biomedical Sciences 
This program is made up of four main classes as well as elective classes that all work together to prepare the students for the BACE (Biotechnician Assistant Credentialing Exam). The University of Florida works with the program teachers to score the exam.

Academy for the Performing Arts

East Lake Chorus
East Lake High School has one of the largest music programs in Pinellas County, having nearly 300 students in vocal music, piano, music theory, and guitar classes. The choir performed the Dona Nobis Pacem cantata by Ralph Vaughan Williams in Carnegie Hall in early 2010 in New York City, and returned in 2011 to perform Mozart's Requiem.

In June 2014, the thirty-two choir traveled to France and performed various concerts including a performance at Notre Dame. In 2016, the choir returned to Carnegie Hall collaborating with several other groups to perform Leonard Bernstein's Chichester Psalms.

Silver Sound Marching Band

East Lake High School also has a marching band that won seven consecutive state championships from 2003 to 2009 in Florida Marching Band Championships (FMBC) Competition, breaking a state record. All bands consistently earn superior ratings at district Music Performance Assessments. In 2005, the Silver Sound Marching band was asked to march in Governor Jeb Bush's Inaugural Parade. In 2013, the Silver Sound Marching Band was invited to perform in the 2014 National Memorial Day Parade in Washington DC. In 2019 the marching band won first place in their class at Largo High School's 43rd Golden Invitational. The group performs at all home and many away football games. Every year the band holds their East Lake Classic Invitational which brings bands from all over the county to compete against one another in their size classes. The band is part of the Performing Arts Academy at East Lake High School.

Concert Band and Wind Ensemble 
The East Lake High School Concert Band and Wind Ensemble is consistently Superior rated at both district and state level performances at Concert and Solo and Ensemble performance assessments. The members of these bands have an average GPA of 3.9 and made up over a third of the 2021 Pinellas All-County High School Ensembles. In 2022, both the Concert Band and Wind Ensemble competed in the annual Festival Disney music performance competition at Walt Disney World. The bands performed in the Ballroom of the Americas at Disney’s Contemporary Resort and awards were presented at Disney’s Hollywood Studios theme park. Both bands earned superiors and best in their class, along with the Wind Ensemble earning grand champion for the entire competition.

Jazz Ensemble 
Within the ELHS band program is the Jazz Ensemble. The Jazz Ensemble is known for earning superiors at the annual Pinellas County Jazz Music-Performance Assessment. In 1996, the Jazz Band was selected to perform at various outdoor venues, including the Centennial Olympic Park for the 1996 Summer Olympics held in Atlanta. The trip was cut short due to the domestic terrorist bombing in the very park they were supposed to perform in just days prior.

Chamber Orchestra 
Among the other bands included in the program, there is the East Lake Chamber Orchestra. Along with the other bands, the orchestra also earns superiors at the annual Pinellas County Orchestra Music-Performance Assessment and sends a handful of students to the Pinellas All-County Orchestra Ensemble. It is one of the biggest school orchestras in the county with over 50 students.

Eagle Works Academy

Engineering 
This classes in this academy include four different robotics courses, four gaming and simulation courses as well as four engineering fundamental courses. Under the umbrella of the program is an E-Sports team which is one of the first of its kind in Pinellas County as well as a robotics team and an Artificial Intelligence Club.

Clubs 

 5000 Role Models
 AI Club
 AVID
 Best Buddies
 Biomedical Club
 Blue Crue
 Chess Club
 Creative Writing Club
 Debate Club
 Drama
 Evergreen Club
 Fellowship of Christian Athletes
 Jewish Student Union
 Key Club
 Model UN
 Robotics Team
 SADD
Silver Sound Marching Band
 Student Government
 Yearbook

Honor Societies 

 Engineering Honor Society
 French Honor Society
 Mu Alpha Theta - Math National Honor Society
 National Art Honor Society
 National English Honor Society
 National Honor Society
 National Technical Honor Society
 Rho Kappa - History Honor Society
 Science National Honor Society
 Spanish National Honor Society
 Thespian Honor Society
 Tri-M Music Honor Society

Rivalries 
In recent years, the school's football matchup with rival Palm Harbor University High School has been described by the Tampa Bay Times as "perhaps the biggest high school football game in Pinellas County" 

Tarpon Springs High School and Countryside High School have also been long time rivals.

TV Production

Eagle Eye News

Eagle Eye News is East Lake High School's television news program, founded in 2003. It is mostly volunteer-driven and student-run except for faculty sponsor Shawn Anderson.

A part of the news set was donated by WTSP-TV Channel 10 (CBS).

Notable alumni
 Chris Coghlan, former MLB left fielder for the Miami Marlins, Chicago Cubs, Oakland A's, and Toronto Blue Jays, 2009 Rookie of the Year
 Travis MacGregor, MLB pitcher in the Pittsburgh Pirates organization
 Eric Hanhold, MLB pitcher in the Pittsburgh pirates organization
 Ryan Snare, Former MLB pitcher for the Texas Rangers
 Cheyanne Buys, American female mixed martial artist, Strawweight division of the Ultimate Fighting Championship
 George Campbell (American football), NFL wide receiver for the New York Jets
 Mason Cole, NFL offensive lineman for the Pittsburgh Steelers 
 Tyler Higbee, NFL tight end for the Los Angeles Rams, Super Bowl LVI Champion
 Justin Strnad, NFL linebacker for the Denver Broncos
 Jake Hansen, NFL linebacker for the Houston Texans
 Artavis Scott, Former NFL wide receiver for the Houston Texans and Los Angeles Chargers, CFP National Champion (2016)

 Sydney Pickrem, Canadian swimmer

External links
 East Lake High School Website
 East Lake Silver Sound
East Lake Drama

References

High schools in Pinellas County, Florida
Educational institutions established in 1987
School buildings completed in 1987
Public high schools in Florida
Buildings and structures in Tarpon Springs, Florida
1987 establishments in Florida